Darktown Revue (1931) is an 18-minute American Pre-Code short film by Oscar Micheaux, his first short venture into sound film. The dances and ensembles were co-directed by Leonard Harper and the picture was shot along with their feature-length all-black talkie, The Exile. As in many early talkies, the camera-work is extremely static. The film included choral singing and several vaudeville acts, including the comedy duo of Tim Moore and Andrew Tribble doing a routine about a haunted house.

References

External links
 
 "The Exile", Film Captures, 

1931 films
1931 musical comedy films
African-American films
American musical comedy films
American black-and-white films
Films directed by Oscar Micheaux
1931 short films
1930s English-language films
1930s American films